Godsville is a collaborative studio album by American record producer Showbiz and rapper KRS-One. It was released digitally on February 15, 2011 via D.I.T.C. Records; although the physical release didn't hit stores until May 8, 2011. Recording sessions took place at Headquarterz Studio in New York. Production was handled entirely by Showbiz with only one track produced with Show's Born Lords groupmate E-Blaze. It features guest appearances from Fred the Godson and Jay Nortey.

It is the second album produced by Show excluding his work with Showbiz and A.G. and the 21st album by KRS-One (including his work with Boogie Down Productions). It follows the theme of KRS-One creating an album fully produced by a legendary New York producer, following Hip Hop Lives with Marley Marl and Meta-Historical with True Master.

Track listing
All tracks produced by Rodney "Showbiz" Lemay, except for track 6 produced with Eric "E-Blaze" Blaze.

References

2011 albums
KRS-One albums
Collaborative albums
Albums produced by Showbiz (producer)